Trio '65 is a studio album by American jazz pianist Bill Evans and his Trio, released in 1965.

Reception

Writing for AllMusic, music critic Scott Yanow wrote of the album: "Although all eight of the selections heard on this Verve release have been recorded on other occasions by pianist Bill Evans, these renditions hold their own."

Track listing
 "Israel" (John Carisi) – 4:49
 "Elsa" (Earl Zindars) – 4:22
 "'Round Midnight" (Thelonious Monk, Cootie Williams) – 6:42
 "Our Love Is Here to Stay" (George Gershwin, Ira Gershwin) – 4:02
 "How My Heart Sings" (Earl Zindars) – 2:49
 "Who Can I Turn To?" (Leslie Bricusse, Anthony Newley) – 4:53
 "Come Rain or Come Shine" (Harold Arlen, Johnny Mercer) – 5:26
 "If You Could See Me Now" (Tadd Dameron, Carl Sigman) – 4:47

Personnel
Bill Evans – piano
Larry Bunker – drums
Chuck Israels – bass

Charts

References

External links
The Bill Evans Memorial Library
Bill Evans discography at Jazz Discography

Bill Evans albums
1965 albums
Albums produced by Creed Taylor
Verve Records albums